This Is Stina Nordenstam is a studio album by Swedish singer-songwriter Stina Nordenstam. It was originally released on Independiente Records in 2001.

Track listing

Charts

References

External links
 

2001 albums
Stina Nordenstam albums
Independiente Records albums
Albums produced by Mitchell Froom
Albums produced by Tchad Blake